Coleura is a genus of sac-winged bats in the family Emballonuridae. It contains three species:
 African sheath-tailed bat (C. afra)
 C. kibomalandy
 Seychelles sheath-tailed bat (C. seychellensis)

References

 
Bat genera
Taxa named by Wilhelm Peters
Taxonomy articles created by Polbot